RFA Robert Middleton (A241) was a Dundas-class coastal stores carrier of the Royal Fleet Auxiliary. Launched in June 1938 and commissioned in August 1938, Robert Middleton was active from 1938 until 1975. Decommissioned in March 1975 Robert Middleton was sold commercially the same year and renamed Myrina.

References

Ships of the Royal Fleet Auxiliary
1938 ships